Kway jap, also spelt kuay jap is a Teochew noodle soup originating in Chinese cuisine consisting of flat, broad rice sheets (kway) in a soup made with dark soy sauce, served with an assortment of pork cuts including offal, pork belly, intestines, and pig's ears, braised duck meat, various kinds of beancurd, preserved salted vegetables, and braised hard-boiled eggs.

Alongside Southern China, the dish is popular particularly in Singapore where there is a significant Teochew diaspora community. Similar variants of the dish could also possibly be found in other parts of Southeast Asia such as Malaysia and Thailand.

See also
Noodle soup

References

Teochew cuisine
Chinese cuisine
Singaporean cuisine
Noodle soups